Liulin Subdistrict is a subdistrict on eastern Hexi District, Tianjin, China. It borders Wanxin Subdistrict in the north, Shuanggang Town in the east, Shuanglin Subdistrict in the south, and Chentangzhuang Subdistrict in the west. Its population was 101,679 as of 2010.

The name Liulin is referring to the concentration of willows along the bank of Hai River within this region.

History

Administrative divisions 
So far in 2021, Liulin Subdistrict is formed from 11 residential communities. They are organized into the following list:

References 

Township-level divisions of Tianjin
Hexi District, Tianjin